Aronda Nyakairima (7 July 1959 – 12 September 2015) was a Ugandan military officer and politician who served in the cabinet of Uganda as minister of internal affairs from 2013 until his death on 11 September 2015. Previously, he served as the chief of defence forces in the Uganda People's Defence Force (UPDF) from 2003 to 2013.

Early life and education
Nyakairima was born in Rukungiri District. He attended Lubiri Senior Secondary School for his O-Level studies from 1971 until 1974. Between 1975 and 1977, he studied at Kitgum High School in Kitgum District for his A-Level education. He joined Makerere University in 1978, graduating in 1981 with a Bachelor of Arts degree in political science. He attended the basic officers course in 1989, after the National Resistance Army (NRA) had captured power in Kampala, Uganda's capital city. He later attended a course in strategic studies at Fort Leavenworth in the United States. He also has further military qualifications from the Egyptian Military Academy in Cairo.

Military career
He joined the NRA in 1982, soon after leaving Makerere University. After the NRA captured power, he worked as an intelligence officer in the Ugandan military. He later was appointed assistant director in the Directorate of Military Intelligence in the UPDF. He was then transferred to the Presidential Protection Unit as an intelligence officer. From there, he served as the commanding officer of the Armored Brigade before his appointment as commander of the UPDF in 2003. He has represented the UPDF in the Ugandan parliament since 1996.

In October 2010, Nyakairima was inducted into the International Hall of Fame at the Lewis and Clark Centre at Fort Leavenworth for attaining the highest position in the military of his country. Nyakairima was inducted together with General Eui Don Wang of South Korea, a 1986 graduate of the command college, and Major General Richard Rhys Jones of New Zealand, a 1992 graduate. Nyakairmina was appointed to the cabinet as minister of internal affairs on 23 May 2013. Katumba Wamala was appointed to replace him as chief of defense forces on the same day.

Personal life
Nyakairima was married to Linda Kahooza with whom he had two children. He was fluent in multiple languages, including Luganda, English, Luo, Runyakitara, and Swahili. On 12 September 2015, while traveling on official duties from South Korea to Dubai, he suffered a heart attack. He was later confirmed dead at the age of 56 years.

See also
 Salim Saleh
 Elly Tumwine
 Mugisha Muntu
 Jeje Odongo
 James Kazini

References

External links
 Gen. Aronda’s legacy lives on one year later
 Ft. Leavenworth Honors Three Foreign Generals

 

1959 births
2015 deaths
People from Rukungiri District
Members of the Parliament of Uganda
Ugandan military personnel
Makerere University alumni
Government ministers of Uganda
Ugandan Anglicans
Ugandan generals
Egyptian Military Academy alumni